The 2021–22 Uttar Baridhara Club's season was the 2nd competitive highest level football season. This season was remarks 27th existence season overall in Bangladesh football. The season cover period were from 1 October 2021 to 31 July  2022

Season summary

October
On 18 October forward Sumon Reza left club  to the free transfer Bashundhara Kings for 2021–22 season.

November
On 27 November Uttar Baridhara SC started their new season with defeated 0–1 against Sheikh Russel KC.

On 1 December Uttar Baridhara Club has played second match of their group and ended the match goalless.

December
On 5 December Uttar Baridhara Club meet against Bangladesh Air Force football club and match ended with a result 1–1. Penalty goal by Uttar Baridhara on 82 Uzbekistan midfielder Evgeniy Kochnov and 49 minutes scored for Bangladesh Air Force Juwel Miah.

On 25 December Uttar Baridhara Club lost 0-3 goals by FIFA Walkover laws against Dhaka Abahani. The match scheduled to play on following date but the clubs withdrawn their name from the tournament. As per FIFA Walkover laws Dhaka Abahani awarded winner of the match.

On 27 December Uttar Baridhara Club lost 0-3 goals by FIFA Walkover laws against Sheikh Russel KC. The match scheduled to play on following date but the clubs withdrawn their name from the tournament. As per FIFA Walkover laws Sheikh Russel KC awarded winner of the match.

February
On 3 February Uttar Baridhara Club played their away match against Sheikh Jamal DC and lost by 1–2 goals. On 12 minutes Gambian forward Sulayman Sillah and Nigerian forward Matthew Chinedu goals on 45 minutes took the lead before half time. Uttar Baridhara Uzbekistan Midfielder 	Evgeniy Kochnev penalty goal on 68 minutes ended the match 2–1.

On 7 February Uttar Baridhara Club lost home match by 0–1 against Bashundhara Kings. In  the first on  26 minutes a goal by Bosnian forward  Stojan Vranješ took the lead Bashundhara Kings till ended of first half. In the second half both team played excellent football but Uttar Baridhara players wouldn't able to score a goal versus Bashundhara Kings. Till the last whistle Bashundhara Kings hold 0–1 the lead and left the field with 3 points.

On 14 February Uttar Baridhara Club drew 0–0 goal against Swadhinata KS at home game. In the first halftime both teams played excellent and competitive football and first halftime finished 0–0 goal. In the second halftime also both teams players hasn't found net and finished the game 0–0. They left the ground with 1 point.

On 19 February Uttar Baridhara Club won by 2–1 goals in the away game versus Muktijoddha Sangsad KC. In the first half both teams played goalless. In the second half on 58 minutes a goal by Arif Hossain Uttar Baridhara took lead and on 64 minutes a goal by Sujon Biswas made score 2–0 but on 88 minutes Japanese Soma Otani score for Muktijoddha Sangsad KC. Uttar Baridhara Club graved first victory of this season.

On 24 February Uttar Baridhara Club lost by 0–2 goals against Bangladesh Police FC at home match. In the first half both team played competitive football and they have ended first half goalless. In the second half on 73 minutes Md Faisal Ahmed Shitol goal took lead Bangladesh Police FC made score 1–0 and on 88 minutes Amredin Sharifi extended it 2–0 for Police FC and they have finished the game with three points.

March
On 2 March Uttar Baridhara Club have lost against Rahmatganj MFS by 1–3 goals in the away game. In the first half Ghanaian forward Philip Adjah goal on 32 minutes got lead Rahmatganj MFS but on 41 minutes Uttar Baridhara Club Uzbekistan midfielder 
Yevgeniy Kochnev goals leveled the score 1–1 after 2 minutes Philip Adjah again score and make score 2–1 before go to halftime break. In the second half on 73 minutes  Midfielder Md Enamul Islam goal helped to win the game by 3–1 score. 

On 6 March Uttar Baridhara Club have won by 3–2 goals against Sheikh Russel KC at home ground. On 7 minutes Aizar Akmatov and on 11 minutes goals by Esmaël Gonçalves 
took early 2–0 lead Sheikh Russel KC. On 39 minutes Saiddoston Fozilov and after a minutes goal by Sujon Biswas equalized score 2–2 goals before called for halftime break. In the second half additional time 90+3 minutes Sujon Biswas secured victory for Uttar Baridhara Club by 3–2 goals.

On 12 March Uttar Baridhara Club drew by 0–0 goal against Dhaka Mohammedan at home game. In the first half time and second half time both teams played excellent and competitive football but their players haven't found the goal post and end of the game score remains 0–0 both teams share point.

On 17 March Uttar Baridhara Club have lost by 2–4 goals versus Chittagong Abahani in the away game. In the first half on 12 minutes penalty goal by Nigerian forward Peter Ebimobowei took lead Chittagong Abahani and his two more goals on 38 & 41 minutes took lead Chittagong Abahani 3–0 before half time Peter Ebi completed his hat trick. In the second half on 61 minutes Afghan midfielder Omid Popalzay make it 4–0 but after 7 minutes Uzbekistan forward Saiddoston Fozilov score for Uttar Baridhara. In the additional time 90+3 minutes a goal by Uzbekistan midfielder Yevgeniy Kochnev reduced their lost to 4–2.

April
On 3 April Uttar Baridhara Club lost by 0–3 goals against Saif Sporting Club in the away match. In the first half on 12 minutes Mfon Udoh goal took lead Saif Sporting Club and before last whistle of halftime on 45+1 minutes goal by Asor Gafurov extended it to 2–0. In the second half on 67 Sazzad Hossain Shakil goals made score 3–0 goals. On 87 minutes shown red card Saif Sporting Club Nasirul Islam Nasir and Yassan Kochnov of Uttar Baridhara Club. Both teams rest of the time played with ten men's squad.

On 7 April 2022 Uttar Baridhara Club have lost against Dhaka Abahani by 2–5 goals in the away match. In the very first minutes Daniel Colindres open goal account for Dhaka Abahani and after three minutes second goal for Dhaka Abahani by Nabib Newaj Jibon make it 2–0 but on 14 Minutes Papon Singh score for Uttar Baridhara Club. On 24 minutes Jewel Rana and again Daniel Colindres on 35 minutes converted score to 4–1 until first half break. On 61 minutes Dhaka Abahani Raphael Augusto make score 5–1 but on 68 minutes Uttar Baridhara Club midfielder Arif Hossain founded net they have reduced their defeat to 5–2 goals. In the 90+1 minutes Uttar Baridhara Club goalkeeper Mohammed Azad Hossen showed red card and sent off him.

On 24 April Uttar Baridhara Club have defeated to Sheikh Jamal DC by 0–2 goals at home ground. In the first half on 2 minutes new signed Nigerian forward Chijoke Alaekwe give lead for Sheikh Jamal DC and on 21 minutes Nigerian another forward Musa Najare score on 21 minutes and they have finished half time. In the second half both teams plyed excellent and defensive football and end of time Sheikh Jamal DC score  remains 2–0 goals.

May
On 8 May Uttar Baridhara Club have won over Swadhinata KS by 2–0 goals in the away game.

On 13 May Uttar Baridhara Club have drew versus Muktijoddha Sangsad KC by 1–1 at home match.

June
On 22 June Uttar Baridhara Club have lost by 2–3 goals against Bangladesh Police FC in the away game.

On 28 June Uttar Baridhara Club have drawn versus Rahmatganj MFS with score 1–1 goal at home venue.

July
On 3 July Uttar Baridhara Club got crushed by 3–5 goals against Sheikh Russel KC in the away game.

On 15 July Uttar Baridhara Club lost against Dhaka Mohammedan by 0–3 goals in the away match.

Current squad
Uttar Baridhara SC squad for 2021–22 season.

Transfer

In

Out

Competitions

Overall

Overview

Independence Cup

Group stage

Group B

Federation Cup

Group stages

Group B

Premier League

League table

Results summary

Results by round

Matches

Statistics

Goalscorers

Source: Matches

References

Bangladeshi football club records and statistics
2021 in Bangladeshi football
2022 in Bangladeshi football